Jochem Dobber (born 8 July 1997) is a Dutch track and field sprint athlete who specialises in the 400 metres. He was a gold medallist in the 4 × 400 metres relay with the Dutch team at the 2021 European Athletics Indoor Championships, setting a Dutch record.

From Santpoort-Zuid, Dobber made his international debut at the 2013 European Youth Olympic Festival, finishing seventh in the 200 metres and taking bronze in the 4 × 100 metres relay alongside Joris van Gool, Rutger Postma, and Sander Brugge. In 2014, he was a finalist at the Dutch under-18 championships in 2014 in 60 metres, 100 metres and 200 m, and repeated that feat at under-20 level the following year. Dobber won Dutch under-20 titles in 200 m indoor and 400 m outdoor disciplines in 2016. These results earned him selection for the 2016 IAAF World U20 Championships, where he reached the semi-finals.

A member of AV Suomi club in Velsen training under Laurent Meuwly,  Dobber competed at his first senior national event at the 2017 Dutch Athletics Championships and placed fourth in the 400 m. His first national podium finish came at the 2018 Dutch Athletics Championships, where he was runner-up to Tony van Diepen. He improved his personal best time to 46.45 seconds that year. Dobber managed third in the 400 m at the 2019 Dutch Indoor Athletics Championships, which brought him a place on the Dutch team for the 2019 IAAF World Relays. In his senior international debut he placed fifth in the B-final with the Netherlands 4 × 400 metres relay quartet, alongside Terrence Agard, Liemarvin Bonevacia, and van Diepen. He also placed second at the 2019 European Team Championships First League with the Dutch relay team.

Dobber won his first national title at the 2020 Dutch Athletics Championships. He also improved his best time to 45.64 seconds, placing fourth at the Golden Gala 2020 Diamond League meeting on that outing. As part of a strong Dutch contingent at the 2021 European Athletics Indoor Championships, he placed fifth in the 400 m final while his teammates van Diepen and Bonevacia won medals. The three combined for the 4 × 400 metres relay final with Ramsey Angela to take the gold medals with a new Dutch national record of the 3:06.06 minutes.

International competitions

National titles
Dutch Athletics Championships
400 m: 2020
Dutch Under-20 Championships
200 m indoor: 2016
400 m outdoor: 2016

Personal bests
Outdoor
100 metres – 10.67 (2021)
200 metres – 20.90 (2021)
300 metres – 34.48 (2016)
400 metres – 45.07 (2021)
4 × 100 metres relay – 42.19 (2013)
4 × 400 metres relay – 2:59.06 (2021)
Indoor
60 metres – 7.08 (2020)
200 metres – 21.59 (2021)
400 metres – 46.51 (2021)
4 × 400 metres relay – 3:06.06 (2021)

See also
List of European Athletics Indoor Championships medalists (men)

References

External links

1997 births
Living people
People from Velsen
Sportspeople from North Holland
Dutch male sprinters
European Athletics Indoor Championships winners
Dutch Athletics Championships winners
Athletes (track and field) at the 2020 Summer Olympics
Medalists at the 2020 Summer Olympics
Olympic silver medalists in athletics (track and field)
Olympic silver medalists for the Netherlands
Olympic athletes of the Netherlands
21st-century Dutch people